Kori Udovički (born 4 December 1961) is a Serbian politician, former Deputy Prime Minister of Serbia, and the Minister of Public Administration and Local Self-Government in the Government of Serbia.

Prior to that position, she served as an Assistant Secretary-General of the United Nations, Assistant Administrator of the UNDP and Director of the Regional Bureau of UNDP for Europe and Commonwealth of Independent States (RBEC) from 2007 to 2012.

Previously she was the founder and the President of the Center for Advanced Economic Studies (CEVES), a Belgrade NGO that works for the advancement of economic research and education in South East Europe. She was also President of the Board of Directors of the Foundation for the Advancement of Economics (FREN). CEVES's main publication is Quarterly Monitor of Economic Trends and Policies in Serbia, a publication that systematically monitors macroeconomic, corporate and financial trends and policies in Serbia. It comes out in Serbian and English and is also posted on the CEVES and FREN websites. Kori Udovički was the Editor in Chief until February 2007.

Education and political career
She graduated from the University of Belgrade Faculty of Economics in 1984 she obtained an MA (1988) and a PhD (1999) in Economics from Yale University. She researched inter-regional trade and integration between the republics of the former Yugoslavia. More recently, she has studied the sustainability of Serbia's macroeconomic framework. From 1993 to 2001, she worked at the IMF in Washington, D.C. and then returned to Belgrade as Special Advisor to the Serbian Minister of Finance and Economic Affairs. In 2002, she became Minister of Energy and Mining in Serbian Government. She was appointed Governor of the National Bank of Serbia on July 23, 2003, a position she held until February 25, 2004, when her appointment was annulled due to the illegal use of a proxy vote in the Serbian parliament .

References

External links 

 RBEC (UNDP)
 FREN

|-

|-

|-

1961 births
Living people
People from La Paz
Governors of the National Bank of Serbia
Serbian economists
United Nations Development Programme officials
University of Belgrade Faculty of Economics alumni
Government ministers of Serbia
Yale Graduate School of Arts and Sciences alumni
Deputy Prime Ministers of Serbia
Women government ministers of Serbia
21st-century Serbian women politicians
21st-century Serbian politicians
Serbian officials of the United Nations